Parornix szocsi is a moth of the family Gracillariidae. It is known from Austria, the Czech Republic, Hungary, Sardinia, Kazakhstan, Romania, the European part of Russia, Slovakia, Spain, Tajikistan and Ukraine.

The larvae feed on Prunus fruticosa and Prunus tenella.

References

Parornix
Moths of Europe
Moths of Asia
Moths described in 1952